The GFA Super Cup, known as BOV Super Cup for sponsorship reasons, is an annual football super cup held before the league season start in Gozo. The match is contested by the champions of the previous First Division season and the holders of the GFA Cup.

The current holders are Nadur Youngsters, who defeated league champions Victoria Hotspurs 3–0 in the final played on 30 August 2019.

Results

Results by club

References

External links 
 Official website of the Gozo Football Association

Football cup competitions in Malta
Football competitions in Gozo